Janak Sapkota (born 1987) is a Nepalese haiku poet who works mainly in the English language. He is based in Finland.

Sapkota's books include Long Days of Rain (2016). His haiku have appeared internationally in poetry journals and magazines such as The Shop, Frogpond, Shamrock, Chrysanthemum, Ardea, Fri haiku, Notes from the Gean, The Living Haiku Anthology. His haiku are included in haiku anthologies such as A Vast Sky, Naad Anunaad, and Poems for the Hazara.

In 2006 he won the Smrufit Samhain International Haiku Award.

Life and work
Born in Baglung, Nepal, he currently resides in Finland.

He is a member of the World Poetry Movement.

Translations of his haiku are published in Finnish, Irish/Gaelic, Swedish, German, Romanian and Hindi.

Awards 
 2006: Smrufit Samhain International Haiku Award
 2009: Ukiah Haiku Award
 2017: Commended Haiku in Iafor Vladmir Devide Haiku Award

Publications 
 2004: Winter Lights, Haiku booklet with Irish Poet Cathal Ó Searcaigh, Cló Ceardlann na gCnoc, Ireland
 2005: Lights Along the Road, co-author with American Poet Suzy Conway, Bamboo Press, Nepal, 
 2010: Full Moon, Limited bilingual edition, Irish translation by Gabriel Rosenstock and illustrations by Danielle Creenaune, Cló Ceardlann na gCnoc, Ireland
 2012: A Firefly Lights the Page / Tulikärpänen valaisee sivun, Bilingual edition, Finnish versions by Arto Lappi, SanaSato, Finland, 
 2013: Whisper of Pines / Cogar na nGiuiseanna,  Bilingual edition, Irish translations by Gabriel Rosenstock, Original Writing, Ireland, 
 2016: Long Days of Rain, The Onslaught Press, United Kingdom,

Inclusion in anthologies
Poems for the Hazara. 2014. .
A Vast Sky. Tancho, 2015. .
Naad Anunaad. Vishwakarma, 2016. .

References 

English-language haiku poets
1987 births
Living people
Nepalese male poets
People from Baglung District
21st-century Nepalese poets
Nepalese expatriates in Finland
English-language poets from Nepal